John Sargeaunt (1857–1922) was a noted classical scholar and schoolmaster of whom The Times wrote: "he will be long remembered for his profound scholarship and his genius as a teacher".

Biography

Born in Irthlingborough, Northamptonshire, on 12 August 1857, John Sargeaunt was educated at Bedford School and at University College, Oxford, where he was a Classical Exhibitioner. He was President of the Oxford Union Society in 1881. After Oxford, Sargeaunt became a master at Inverness Royal Academy, and then, in 1885, at Felsted School in Essex. In January 1890, he began teaching at Westminster School, as Master of the Classical Sixth Form. He retired from this post nearly twenty-nine years later, at Christmas 1918, and moved to a small house which he had built at Fairwarp in Sussex.

John Sargeaunt published widely and his work was highly regarded. He died in Hove, Sussex, on 20 March 1922, aged 64, and his death was the subject of a leading article in The Times on 24 March 1922.

Publications
Annals of Westminster School, Methuen, 1898
Virgil’s Pastorals in English Verse, Routledge, 1900
Pope’s Essay on Criticism, Oxford University Press, 1909
Dryden’s Poems (The Restored Text), Oxford University Press, 1910
Terence in English Prose, Loeb Classical Library, 1912
The Trees, Shrubs, and Plants of Virgil, Longman, 1920

Westminster Verses, T. Fisher Unwin, 1922
A History of Bedford School, T. Fisher Unwin, 1925

References

External links
 
 

1857 births
1922 deaths
People educated at Bedford School
Alumni of University College, Oxford
Schoolteachers from Northamptonshire
British writers
People from Irthlingborough
Presidents of the Oxford Union